Quiabentia is a genus of cacti, closely related to Pereskiopsis.

Species
Species of the genus Quiabentia according to Plants of the World Online :

References

External links

 
Opuntioideae genera